Dawn (stylized as dawn) is the second extended play by American musician Mxmtoon. The EP was self-released by the artist (and distributed by AWAL) on April 22, 2020, with an "edits" EP of alternative takes following on July 24, 2020. It was promoted by the singles "Fever Dream", "Quiet Motions", and "Lessons". Dawn sees Mxmtoon shift from the bedroom pop styles of The Masquerade, into straightforward pop. It is the first of a two-EP project, with the sequel Dusk released later in the year. The EPs were originally going to be promoted through the Dusk & Dawn tour across North America in Summer 2020, though due to the COVID-19 pandemic that did not occur.

Critical reception 

Dawn received generally favorable reviews from critics. El Hunt of NME called it "her most substantial record yet" and praised its production, vocals, and songwriting. Matt Yuyitung of Exclaim! complimented the EP's expanding sounds, compared her and compared her songwriting to King Princess. Yuyitung also commented on Mxmtoon's move towards pop music, saying "Twenty minutes is all Maia needs to show that pop success is very much in her grasp if she wants it."

Track listing 
Credits taken from Tidal.

Notes
 All track titles are stylized in all lowercase.

References 

2020 EPs
Mxmtoon albums
Self-released EPs
Pop music EPs
Dream pop EPs